The Spider and the Butterfly is a 1909 French silent film directed by Georges Méliès.

Production
Méliès plays the magician in the film.

Release and survival
The Spider and the Butterfly was released by Méliès's Star Film Company, and is numbered 1530–1533 in its catalogues.

The end of Méliès's filmmaking career was marked by mounting financial difficulties, forcing him eventually to close his studio. In 1923, Méliès discarded his collection of negative and positive prints for his films. After living forgotten and in poverty for some years, Méliès was rediscovered by film devotées in the late 1920s. On 16 December 1929, a "Gala Méliès" was held at the Salle Pleyel in Paris, reintroducing Méliès and his work to posterity.

The Gala Méliès included projection of eight Méliès films that had managed to be recovered, including The Spider and the Butterfly (the others were Whimsical Illusions, The Diabolic Tenant, The Wandering Jew, A Trip to the Moon, Baron Munchausen's Dream, The Merry Frolics of Satan, and The Conquest of the Pole). After the Gala, the print of The Spider and the Butterfly went missing once again; it was presumed lost as of 2008. A fragment of the film was rediscovered in time to be included in a 2010 DVD collection of some of Méliès's films.

References

External links
 

Films directed by Georges Méliès
French silent short films
1909 films
1900s rediscovered films
French black-and-white films
French fantasy films
1900s fantasy films
Rediscovered French films
1900s French films